The discography of hip hop recording artist Belly comprises three studio albums, 11 mixtapes and 24 singles.

Albums

Studio albums

Mixtapes

Singles

As lead artist

Notes

References 

Discographies of American artists
Hip hop discographies